Tulsi Vivah (The Marriage of Tulsi) is a 1971 Bollywood fantasy drama film based on mythology. Directed by Chandrakant, the film stars Jayshree Gadkar and Anita Guha and narrates the origin of the Tulsi Vivah ritual.

Cast
Abhi Bhattacharya ...  God Vishnu 
Jayshree Gadkar ...  Vrinda 
Randhawa ...  Jalandhara 
Dara Singh ...  God Shiva
Anita Guha ...  Goddess Lakshmi 
Geetanjali ...  Goddess Parvati 
Rajan Haksar ...  God Indra 
Polson ... Senapati Khantasur 
Babu Raje ... Narada
Ratnamala ... Vrinda's Mother
Sunder ...  Senapati's father-in-law 
Tun Tun ... Senapati's mother-in-law

Music
"Bhagwan Ye De Vardaan Mujhe Har Saans Me Tera Naam Rahe" - Asha Bhosle
"Jwala Ki Chunri Jwala Ki Choli, Pehan Ke Chal Di" - Mahendra Kapoor
"Arre Meri Sawa Lakh Ki Nathni Lut GayiTeri Najariya Me" - Asha Bhosle
"Chalti Phirti Dukh Ki Kahani, Teri Bhi Kya Jindgani" - Mahendra Kapoor
"Mar Jayenge Hum Phir Bhi Sajan Yahi Kahenge" - Asha Bhosle
"Meri Tapasyaon Meri Sahay Karo, Meri Sadhnaao Meri Sahay Karo" - Asha Bhosle
"Mil Gaye Mil Gaye Mere Meet Salone, Peeraha Ki Bela Beet Gayi" - Krishna Kalle
"Natraj Mai Naari Niraali, Mai Himalay KiRahne Wali" - Asha Bhosle
"Tulsi Kunwari Bani Hai Dulhan, Dulha Saligraam Sakhiyo Do Taali" - Asha Bhosle
"Uttar Dakshin Ke Digpaalo Jaago, Purab Pashchim Ke Rakhwalo Jaago" - Mahendra Kapoor
"Tulsi Kunwari" (part 2) - Asha Bhosle
"Uttar Dakshin" (part 2) - Mahendra Kapoor

External links
 

1971 films
1970s Hindi-language films
Hindu mythological films
1970s fantasy films
Films scored by C. Ramchandra
Films about Indian weddings
Indian fantasy films